Park Jin-Yi  (born April 5, 1983) is a South Korean football player who since 2007 has played for Gyeongnam FC.

Club honours
At Gyeongnam FC
Korean FA Cup runner-up: 1
 2008

References

1983 births
Living people
South Korean footballers
Association football midfielders
Gyeongnam FC players